The 2019 Internationaux de Tennis de Blois was a professional tennis tournament played on clay courts. It was the seventh edition of the tournament which was part of the 2019 ATP Challenger Tour. It took place in Blois, France between 17 and 23 June 2019.

Singles main-draw entrants

Seeds

 1 Rankings are as of 10 June 2019.

Other entrants
The following players received wildcards into the singles main draw:
  Samuel Brosset
  Maxime Hamou
  Matteo Martineau
  Holger Vitus Nødskov Rune
  Enzo Wallart

The following players received entry into the singles main draw using their ITF World Tennis Ranking:
  Corentin Denolly
  Arthur Rinderknech
  Peter Torebko
  Botic van de Zandschulp
  Tim van Rijthoven

The following player received entry into the singles main draw using a protected ranking:
  Nicolás Barrientos

The following players received entry into the singles main draw as alternates: 
  Daniel Dutra da Silva
  Jonathan Eysseric
  Rubén Ramírez Hidalgo

The following players received entry from the qualifying draw:
  Sergio Galdós
  Mark Vervoort

The following player received entry as a lucky loser:
  Youlian Iakovlev

Champions

Singles

  Pedro Sousa def.  Kimmer Coppejans 4–6, 6–3, 7–6(7–4).

Doubles

  Corentin Denolly /  Alexandre Müller def.  Sergio Galdós /  Andreas Siljeström 7–5, 6–7(5–7), [10–6].

References

2019 ATP Challenger Tour
2019
2019 in French tennis
June 2019 sports events in France